This article shows statistics of individual players for the football club F.C. Copenhagen. It also lists all matches that F.C. Copenhagen played in the 2008–09 season.

Events
 2 April: Forward Marcus Allbäck agrees a 1½ year contract with Swedish club Örgryte IS, meaning he will leave FCK on a free transfer on 1 July.
 26 May: Midfielder Michael Silberbauer joins FC Utrecht on a free transfer.
 26 May: Assistant coach Peter Nielsen stops.
 4 June: Bård Wiggen signs as new assistant coach.
 6 July: Captain Michael Gravgaard is sold to FC Nantes for DKK 29,000,000
 8 July: Midfielder Morten Bertolt is sold to SønderjyskE for DKK 1,000,000.
 14 July: It was published that midfielder Thomas Kristensen will join FCK on 1 January on a free transfer.
 15 July: F.C. Copenhagen and FC Nordsjælland agrees on a transfer fee for Thomas Kristensen, so he can transfer immediately.
 18 July: Forward César Santin is bought from Kalmar FF for DKK 15,000,000. He will join on 24 July.
 25 July: Defender Peter Larsson is bought from Halmstads BK for DKK 15,000,000.
 28 July: Goalkeeper Johan Wiland is bought from IF Elfsborg. He will join the club 1 January 2009.
 22 December: Midfielder Martin Vingaard is bought from Esbjerg fB for DKK 7,000,000.
 12 January: Forward Dame N'Doye is bought from OFI Crete for DKK 15,000,000.
 14 January: Midfielder Mads Laudrup is sold to Herfølge Boldklub.

Players

Squad information
This section show the squad as currently, considering all players who are confirmedly moved in and out (see section Players in / out).

Squad stats

Players in / out

In

Out

Club

Coaching staff

Kit

|
|
|
|
|

Other information

*During rebuilt

Competitions

Overall

Danish Superliga

Classification

Results summary

Results by round

Matches

Competitive

Friendlies

References

External links
 F.C. Copenhagen official website

F.C. Copenhagen seasons
Copenhagen